Acanthonevroides is a genus of tephritid  or fruit flies in the family Tephritidae.

Species 
 Acanthonevroides basalis (Walker, 1853)
 Acanthonevroides jarvisi (Tryon, 1927)
 Acanthonevroides mayi Permkam & Hancock, 1995
 Acanthonevroides nigriventris (Malloch, 1939)
 Acanthonevroides variegatus Permkam & Hancock, 1995

References

Phytalmiinae
Tephritidae genera